The 2020–21 NHL Three Star Awards are the way the National Hockey League denotes its players of the week and players of the month of the 2020–21 season.

Throughout the season the NHL will also celebrate the efforts of the off-ice stars who make it possible for games to be played amid a pandemic by honoring frontline healthcare heroes from the regions represented by the weekly and monthly stars.

Weekly

Monthly

Rookie of the Month

References

Three Star Awards
Lists of NHL Three Star Awards